John the Hermit may refer to:

John the Hermit (Armenian) (4th century), Armenian saint
John of Egypt (d. 394)
Pope John II (III) of Alexandria (d. 516)
John the Silent (d. c. 558)
John Xenos (d. c. 1030)
Juan de Ortega (hermit) (d. 1163)
John of Tufara, Italian saint (d.1170)